Pen-y-Lan is a Welsh place name:

Pen-y-lan, Ceredigion, a hamlet in west Wales
Penylan, a district of the city of Cardiff, Wales
Pen-y-Lan, a district of the city of Swansea
Pen-y-Lan Hall, a grade II listed mansion located near the village of Ruabon in Wrexham County Borough

See also
 Penny Lane (disambiguation)